The NATAS Lower Great Lakes Chapter is one of 19 regional chapters of the National Academy of Television Arts & Sciences. The Lower Great Lakes Chapter (formerly Cleveland Chapter) was founded in 1969. In addition to granting Emmy® Awards to professional members in the Lower Great Lakes region, the chapter awards scholarships, honors industry veterans with the Gold and Silver Circle Awards, conducts Regional Student Television Awards of Excellence (RSTV), has a free research and a nationwide job bank. The chapter also participates in judging Emmy® Award entries at the regional and national levels.

Boundaries

The Lower Great Lakes Chapter of NATAS is divided into the following boundaries and encompasses all of northern Ohio (including Cleveland, Akron, Canton, Toledo, Lima, Mansfield and Youngstown), central and northern Indiana (including Indianapolis, Bloomington, Muncie, Lafayette and Ft. Wayne), and Erie, Pennsylvania. These boundaries or region are responsible for the submission of television broadcast and web materials presented for awards consideration.

Board of governors

The Board of Governors is a volunteer board of industry professionals who work together collaboratively, which ensures the best interests of the membership.

Executive Director: Robert Hammer

President: Daniel Spehler, WXIN

1st Vice President: Carl Monday, WJW

2nd Vice President: Vickie Binkley, WXIN

Treasurer: James Stunek, WOIO

Secretary: Susanne Schwibs, Indiana University Media School

Trustee: Steve Warren, Bally Sports

Trustee: Megan Simpson, WTHR

Alternate Trustee: Daniel Spehler, WXIN

References

Regional Emmy Awards
Awards established in 1969
1969 establishments in Ohio